Ribarci may refer to:
 Ribarci, Novaci, North Macedonia
 Ribarci (Bosilegrad), Serbia